Ghor University is located in  Ghor province, northern Afghanistan.

See also 
List of universities in Afghanistan

References

Universities in Afghanistan
University